Aida Vladimirovna Shanayeva (born 23 April 1986) is a Russian foil fencer, team Olympic champion at the 2008 Summer Olympics, World champion at 2009 World Fencing Championships and twice team World champion (2006 and 2011).

Shanayeva won the gold medal in the foil team event at the 2006 World Fencing Championships after beating USA in the final. She accomplished this with her teammates Svetlana Boyko, Julia Khakimova and Ianna Rouzavina.

External links
 
  (archive)
  (archive)
 
 

1986 births
Living people
Russian female foil fencers
Sportspeople from Vladikavkaz
Fencers at the 2008 Summer Olympics
Fencers at the 2012 Summer Olympics
Fencers at the 2016 Summer Olympics
Olympic fencers of Russia
Olympic gold medalists for Russia
Olympic silver medalists for Russia
Olympic medalists in fencing
Medalists at the 2012 Summer Olympics
Medalists at the 2008 Summer Olympics
21st-century Russian women